The Belica (Serbian Cyrillic: Белица) is a left tributary of the Great Morava in Central Serbia. It is created by the confluence of smaller rivers Voljavica and Bešnjaja, flows through a deforested valley to the town Jagodina.

Notes

References

External links

Rivers of Serbia